The Turkish Basketball Presidential Cup, sometimes referred to as Turkish Basketball Super Cup, is the professional men's basketball super cup competition that takes place each year in Turkey. The competition began in the year 1985. One game is held to determine the winner of the competition. It is played between the winners of the Basketbol Süper Ligi and the winners of the Turkish Cup season. If the same team wins both the Turkish Super League and the Turkish Cup in the same season, then the competition takes place between the two league finalists from the Super League.

Finals

Source:

Performance by club 
Teams shown in italics are no longer in existence.

See also 
 Men's
 Turkish Men's's Basketball League  
 Turkish Men's Basketball Cup
 Turkish Men's Basketball Presidential Cup
 Wome's
Turkish Women's Basketball League
Turkish Women's Basketball Cup
Turkish Women's Basketball Presidential Cup

References

External links
Turkish Basketball Federation Official Website 
Turkish Presidential Cup
Official BSL Stats

1985 establishments in Turkey
 
Supercup
Basketball supercup competitions in Europe